Bilateral relations between the Kingdom of Saudi Arabia and the Singapore began in November 1977. Singapore has an embassy in Riyadh and consulate general in Jeddah. Saudi Arabia has an embassy in Singapore.

Economic relations
The bilateral trade between Singapore and Saudi Arabia was determined to worth S$23 billion in 2013  Much of this was due to oil, which is the major import into Singapore. Non-oil industrial Saudi companies exports their products which include crude oil, petrochemicals and plastics, aluminum, minerals, electrical appliances, materials of construction . Also, some Saudi companies base their operations in Singapore, looking mostly to capitalize on the country's strategic position which is the heart of the Asia-Pacific market.

See also 
 Foreign relations of Saudi Arabia 
 Foreign relations of Singapore

References 

 
Singapore
Bilateral relations of Singapore